Janaka Gunaratne (born 14 March 1981) is a Sri Lankan cricketer. He played 157 first-class and 114 List A matches for multiple domestic sides in Sri Lanka between 2001 and 2015. He made his Twenty20 debut on 17 August 2004, for Chilaw Marians Cricket Club in the 2004 SLC Twenty20 Tournament. His last first-class match was for Moors Sports Club in the 2014–15 Premier Trophy on 26 March 2015.

See also
 List of Chilaw Marians Cricket Club players

References

External links
 

1981 births
Living people
Sri Lankan cricketers
Abahani Limited cricketers
Basnahira South cricketers
Chilaw Marians Cricket Club cricketers
Moors Sports Club cricketers
North Central Province cricketers
Ruhuna cricketers
Uthura Rudras cricketers
Place of birth missing (living people)